Cicatrizocera bilistrata is a species of beetle in the family Cerambycidae, the only species in the genus Cicatrizocera.

References

Piezocerini
Monotypic Cerambycidae genera